Grand Central Publishing is a book publishing imprint of Hachette Book Group, originally established in 1970 as Warner Books when Warner Communications acquired the Paperback Library. When Time Warner sold their book publishing business to Hachette Livre in March 2006, the North American operations of the Time Warner Book Group were renamed Hachette Book Group, while the group's Warner Books imprint became Grand Central Publishing, named in part by the proximity of their new offices to New York's Grand Central Terminal.

In addition to the Grand Central imprint itself, Grand Central Publishing has several sub-imprints including Balance, Forever/Forever Yours, Legacy Lit, and Twelve.

Twelve 
Twelve, founded in 2006, is known for releasing only one book per month.  The imprint, which is considered "boutique," has printed titles by Christopher Hitchens, Benjamin Hale, Daniel Menaker and Ben Schreckinger. Twelve is considered a "prestige publisher."

References

External links 
 
 
 Predecessor 
 Warner Books at the Internet Speculative Fiction Database

Book publishing companies based in New York (state)